Murray Theater may refer to:

in the United States
Murray Theater (Richmond, Indiana), listed on the NRHP in Indiana
Murray Theater (Murray, Utah), listed on the NRHP in Utah